"And They Call It Bobby Love" is the second episode in the third season of the Fox animated series King of the Hill and the 37th episode overall, which aired on Fox on September 22, 1998. The episode's plot follows protagonist Hank Hill's son Bobby's relationship with Marie, a girl whose vegetarian lifestyle clashes strongly with the Hill family's traditionally omnivorous diet, notably with Hank's infatuation with grilling meat. A subplot involves Hank, Dale, Bill, and Boomhauer acquiring an abandoned couch and subsequently adding it to their beer-drinking area of the neighborhood alley.

The episode's title references a lyric from the chorus of the Paul Anka song "Puppy Love". It is the only episode of the series to win a Primetime Emmy Award for Outstanding Animated Program (For Programming less than One Hour).

Plot
Bobby begins a relationship with Marie, a vegetarian, and Hank and the guys find an abandoned couch in their alleyway.

Over the course of his relationship with his newfound girlfriend, Bobby experiences his first kiss, but their relationship quickly sours as Bobby's affection for Marie is revealed to be much greater than her affection for him. As a result, Bobby and Marie decide to end their relationship, and Bobby's reaction to it is strongly negative. To cheer up their son, Hank and Peggy take Bobby to the Panhandler Steakhouse where he sees Marie also having dinner with her parents. He takes on the restaurant's standing challenge to eat a 72-ounce steak in under an hour, simultaneously spiting Marie and finding catharsis by eating the entire steak in just 37 minutes as everyone in the restaurant watches. He later vomits from overeating, which Connie initially feared might be his still reacting to the break-up.

Meanwhile, Hank, Dale, Bill, and Boomhauer discover an abandoned couch in the alley, which they are initially against using as a backdrop for their daily ritual of drinking beer and chatting. As the days progress, they grow to like drinking in their usual spot while sitting on the couch. The couch is also where Bobby and Marie kissed, somewhat to Bill's annoyance. The couch disappears near the end of the episode, but it is ultimately revealed that Bill has moved the couch into his living room.

Reception 
The episode was nominated for the category of Primetime Emmy Award for Outstanding Animated Program (For Programming less than One Hour) at the 51st Primetime Emmy Awards show on September 12, 1999. The A.V. Club had it on a list of "10 episodes that made King of the Hill one of the most human cartoons ever" with Genevieve Koski saying the steak eating scene "remains one of the best scenes in the show’s history."

References

1998 American television episodes
King of the Hill episodes
Television episodes about vegetarianism
Emmy Award-winning episodes